OOFEM is a free and open-source multi-physics finite element code with object oriented architecture. The aim of this project is to provide efficient and robust tool for FEM computations as well as to offer highly modular and extensible environment for development.

Main features 
 Solves various linear and nonlinear problems from structural, thermal and fluid mechanics.
 Particularly includes many material models for nonlinear fracture mechanics of quasibrittle materials, such as concrete.
 Efficient parallel processing support based on domain decomposition and message passing paradigms.
 Direct as well as iterative solvers are available. Direct solvers include symmetric and unsymmetric skyline solver and sparse direct solver. Iterative solvers support many sparse storage formats and come with various preconditioners. Interfaces to third party linear and eigen value solver libraries are available, including IML, PETSc, SLEPc, and SPOOLES.
 Support for eXtented Finite Elements (XFEM) and iso-geometric analysis (IGA).

License 
OOFEM is free, open source software, released under the GNU Lesser General Public License version 2.1 on any later version

See also 
 List of numerical analysis software
 List of finite element software packages

References

External links
 Project website

Community resources

 OOFEM forum
 OOFEM wiki

Finite element software
Scientific simulation software
Free computer-aided design software
Free software programmed in C++
Finite element software for Linux